José Enrique Ramírez (born September 17, 1992) is a Dominican professional baseball third baseman for the Cleveland Guardians of Major League Baseball (MLB).  He signed with the Indians as an amateur free agent on November 26, 2009, and made his MLB debut on September 1, 2013.

In 2016, Ramírez achieved then-career highs of a .312 batting average, 46 doubles and 22 stolen bases while playing second base, shortstop, and left field, in addition to third base.  He also helped lead the Indians to its first World Series appearance in 19 years.  As a result, Ramírez was named winner of the Bob Feller Man of the Year Award (the equivalent of the team Most Valuable Player award) for the first time, and received the award again in 2021.

Ramírez is a four-time selectee to the MLB All-Star Game, a three-time Silver Slugger Award award winner, and a one-time selectee to the All-MLB Team.  In 2017, he became the 19th player in history to hit at least 56 doubles in one season, while leading the major leagues.  In 2018, he hit 39 home runs and stole 34 bases to enter the 30–30 club.

Career

Cleveland Indians / Guardians
Born in Baní, Ramírez played baseball in the Dominican Prospect League. In 2009, at the age of 17, Ramírez and other unsigned prospects traveled to the Cleveland Indians' Dominican facility in Boca Chica, where an Indians scout noticed Ramírez. He signed with the Indians, receiving a $50,000 signing bonus.

Ramírez sat out the 2010 season and made his professional debut in 2011 with the Arizona Indians of the Rookie-level Arizona League. He batted .325 in 48 games played. He then played for the Toros del Este of the Dominican Winter League. In 2012, he played for the Mahoning Valley Scrappers of the Class A-Short Season New York-Penn League and Lake County Captains of the Class A Midwest League. The next year, he started the season with the Akron Aeros of the Class AA Eastern League.

2013—2015: Early major league career

The Indians promoted Ramírez to the major leagues on September 1, 2013, and he made his MLB debut that day. He entered the game as a pinch runner during the ninth inning and scored on a game-winning grand slam hit by Mike Avilés.  Ramírez recorded his first major league hit on September 9 against the Kansas City Royals, when he lined a single to left field off of Royals starter Ervin Santana during the third inning.  Later in that same game, Ramírez also collected his first multiple hit game in the major leagues, working a single off reliever Wade Davis during the seventh inning.

Ramírez began the 2014 season in the minor leagues and had a batting line of .319/.363/.484 in 105 plate appearances. He was promoted to the major leagues on May 1, as Indians second baseman Jason Kipnis went on the disabled list. Ramírez was sent back to the minors on May 20, after Kipnis was reinstated. However, Ramírez was recalled before July 23.

Ramírez began to get regular playing time at shortstop on July 31, 2014, after the Indians traded shortstop Asdrúbal Cabrera.
 He hit his first home run on August 9, in his first career three-hit game. Ramírez finished the 2014 season by hitting .262 in 237 at-bats. He compiled 62 hits and also had 10 steals, tied for fourth-most on the team.

In 2015, Ramírez made his first Opening Day roster. He started on Opening Day, batting ninth and playing shortstop. He also started the Indians home opener on April 10. Ramírez went 1-for-4 in the team's first game at newly renovated Progressive Field.

Ramírez, and the Indians, struggled during the first half of the 2015 season. The team fell to last place in the AL Central during June, and Ramírez would be sent down to the Columbus Clippers of the Class AAA International League during that span. After being called back up for the second time on August 3, Ramírez would play much better, hitting .250 over the second half of the season. He closed out the 2015 season by hitting .280 in September and October with 21 hits. He also had a power surge in September, hitting four home runs while setting his career high for home runs in a single month.

2016: World Series appearance

In 2016, Ramírez hit .312/.355/.423 as of July 8, 2016.  He became the first player during 2016 to hit in every spot in the lineup when he batted fourth on June 28. Ramírez had also played four positions this year: second base, third base, shortstop, and left field.  When asked about Ramírez's play, Indians hitting coach Ty Van Burkleo noted that Ramírez "has done a great job all year."  He also concluded that with the Indians missing Michael Brantley, Ramírez has really stepped up in the heart of their batting order and "been a real shot in the arm" for the organization.

As of July 14, Ramírez was third in the American League with a .377 batting average with runners in scoring position. He backed that up on June 19, when he hit a walk-off single in the 10th inning against the Chicago White Sox, which gave the Indians a 3-2 win. That win was the third of 14 straight wins for the Indians, which was then a franchise record. Their 14 straight wins from June 17 to July 1 is not only a franchise record but also the longest win streak in baseball since 2013.  During the streak, Ramírez batted .298 while compiling 17 hits and nine RBI.  On September 17, his 24th birthday, he hit a walk-off single in the bottom of the 10th inning to give the Indians a 1–0 victory over the Detroit Tigers.  He finished the season having established then career-highs of a .312 batting average, 46 doubles, 11 home runs, 76 RBI, 22 stolen bases, and 4.8 Wins Above Replacement (WAR or bWAR, per Baseball-Reference.com).

In the fifth game of the World Series, Ramírez hit a home run, giving Cleveland a 1–0 lead over the Chicago Cubs.  He hit .310 (9-for-31) in the World Series, with one each of a walk, home run, and double.  The Cubs ultimately prevailed, however, with Cleveland falling one run short in Game 7 in a bid for their first championship since 1948.  

The Cleveland chapter of the Baseball Writers' Association of America (BBWAA) selected Ramírez as the Bob Feller Man of the Year Award winner, the equivalent of the club's Most Valuable Player (MVP) Award.  He also received consideration for the AL MVP for the first time, placing 17th.

2017: Silver Slugger Award

On March 28, 2017, Ramírez signed a five-year contract extension worth $26 million.  In June, he collected nine consecutive multi-hit games, the longest such streak for an Indians player since Roy Hughes in 1936.  He was named AL Player of the Week for the first time in his career on June 18, after batting .516 with 16 hits, three home runs, seven RBI and a stolen base.  He raised his average from .265 to .320 over his previous 22 games.  When Jason Kipnis sustained a hamstring injury on July 9, the Indians placed him on the 10-day DL,  and shifted Ramírez to cover second base to replace him for much of the remainder of the season.  Ramírez was selected by fan voting as the starting third baseman for the American League in the 2017 MLB All-Star Game.

On September 3 versus the Detroit Tigers, Ramírez tied a major league record with five extra-base hits, which included three doubles and two home runs.  Incidentally, both home runs received "help", as both were catchable.  For the first home run, Mikie Mahtook pushed the ball over the fence with his bare hand.  On the second, the ball bounced off Alex Presley's glove and touched the yellow stripe of the fence for a home run.  That game was also the 11th of a 22-game win streak spanning August 24−September 15, which surpassed the 2002 Oakland Athletics' 20 consecutive wins for the American League record, and was the second longest all-time to the New York Giants' 26 consecutive in 1916.  In that streak, Ramírez made the strongest offensive contribution, batting .423/.462/.944.  He was named AL Player of the Week on September 5.

In 152 games played in 2017, Ramirez finished with an MLB-leading 56 doubles, a .318 batting average, .957 OPS, 29 home runs, 83 RBI, and 107 runs scored.  He totaled 91 extra base hits, the second-highest total in one season for a switch hitter in major league history.  He became just the 19th player to hit at least 56 doubles in one season.  His .957 OPS is the highest-ever in one season for a player who made at least 60 appearances at both second base and third base.  Of the 74 major league batters to hit at least 25 home runs, Ramírez struck out the fewest times (69).

End of season awards for Ramírez included selection as designated hitter on Baseball America's All-MLB Team, and his first career Silver Slugger Award, as the top-hitting AL third baseman.  He received a nomination as one of three Rawlings Gold Glove Award finalists at third base.  He placed third in the AL Most Valuable Player Award balloting, behind winner José Altuve and Aaron Judge.

2018: 30–30 club
On May 29, 2018, Ramírez hit his 17th home run of the season in a 9–1 victory versus the Chicago White Sox.  He joined Albert Belle as the only hitters in Cleveland Indians to have hit at least that many home runs before the end of May, and for the month had batted .336, 11 home runs and 25 RBI.  He had 18 home runs on the year at that point, second to Belle in 1996 with 21 home runs for most at the end of May in franchise history.  Further, Ramírez and Francisco Lindor became the first Cleveland teammates to both hit at least 10 home runs in one month since Jim Thome and Karim García in 2002.

Slashing .292/.395/.590 with 24 home runs, 59 RBI, and 19 stolen bases, Ramírez was named the starting third baseman for the AL in the 2018 MLB All-Star Game.  On September 9 versus the Toronto Blue Jays, he registered his 30th stolen base, in addition to 37 home runs, to join the 30–30 club – the first in the majors since Mike Trout in 2012.  Ramírez was the 49th member of this group, and the third Indian to do so, joining Joe Carter (1987) and Grady Sizemore (2008).

For the season, Ramírez batted .270/.387/.552, and led the major leagues in walks-per-strikeout at 1.33.   He also led the American League in power-speed number (36.3), and had the highest number of pitches per plate appearance in the major leagues (4.30). 
He became the first Indians player to achieve 30 home runs, 30 stolen bases, 100 runs scored and 100 RBI in the same season.  However, he batted .302 before the All-Star break and .218 after.  Ramírez batted 2-for-20 (.100) in the 2018 ALDS, as Cleveland lost to the Houston Astros.

2019 
Ramírez began the 2019 season continuing the slump that he endured towards the end of the 2018 season. Over a span of 102 games beginning August 18, 2018, he batted .189.  He was being pitched with much fewer fastballs that he could drive, resulting in more popups with much weaker overall contact.  From Opening Day of 2017 to August 18, 2018, he had pulled 42 fastballs for home runs, leading the major leagues.  In the 102 game span, he had hit four.  He batted .218 with a .308 OBP and .344 SLG in the first half of the 2019 season.

However, Ramírez experienced a resurgence as the season progressed.  On August 15, 2019, he hit his first career grand slam in the first inning against the New York Yankees.  In his next at-bat, he hit a two-run home run as the Indians won, 19–5.  After the All-Star break, he was second in MLB with 32 extra-base hits and third with 40 RBI, when he broke the hamate bone in the right wrist on August 24, requiring surgery.  He appeared in 129 games on the season, hitting .255 with 23 home runs, 83 RBI, and 24 stolen bases.

2020: Silver Slugger Award 

The 2020 season began slowly for Ramírez as he dealt with a thumb injury.  He batted .230 with six doubles, five home runs, and 18 RBI for the first month.  Starting August 25, he batted .358 with 12 home runs and 28 RBI.  Over a seven-game span in September, Ramírez homered six times to help carry the Indians' playoff run following an eight-game losing streak.  On September 22, he hit a walk-off home run in the tenth inning to defeat the Chicago White Sox 5–3, clinching a playoff berth for Cleveland.

Ramírez garnered the AL Player of the Month Award for September, batting .366/.453/.841 with nine doubles, 10 home runs, 24 RBI, 1.294 OPS, 19 extra base hits, and 69 total bases.  He led MLB for the month in home runs (tied), OBP, SLG, OPS, total bases (tied), and doubles (tied).  He was second in batting.  Each of his last 11 hits the regular season went for extra bases.  He led the club with 17 home runs on the season.

Ramírez concluded the season batting .292, .386 OBP, and career-highs in OPS (.993), slugging percentage (.607), and OPS+ (163).  He also tallied 64 hits, 45 runs scored, 16 doubles, 17 home runs, 46 RBI, 133 total bases, 34 extra base hits, 31 walks, and ten stolen bases.  Per FanGraphs' version of WAR (fWAR), he led the major leagues with 3.4.  He also tied for the AL lead in runs scored with Tim Anderson, and in extra base hits with José Abreu, both of the White Sox.  Ramírez placed second in OPS and total bases, third in slugging percentage, doubles, home runs, and RBI, fifth in stolen bases and adjusted OPS+, and tenth in walks. This performance netted Ramírez his third career Silver Slugger Award and a second-place finish to Abreu in the AL MVP voting.

2021: Bob Feller Man of the Year 
In 2021, Ramírez was selected to the MLB All-Star Game for the third time of his career.  At the time of the announcement, he had batted .265 with an .882 OPS, 54 runs scored, 18 doubles, 18 home runs, 50 RBI, and six stolen bases.  His 6.5 fWAR and 138 wRC+ both ranked second among AL third baseman behind Rafael Devers of the Red Sox.  Ramírez produced the highest batted ball pull percentage in the major leagues, at 56.8%.  He was chosen as the winner of Bob Feller Man of the Year Award, the second of his career.

The Indians exercised the club option on Ramírez' contract for the 2022 season on November 5, 2021.

2022: Contract extension 
On April 6, 2022, Ramírez signed a 5-year, $124 million extension with the Cleveland Guardians.  Combined with his contract extension signed in November 2021, Ramírez' new contract guaranteed nearly $150 million through 2028.  The largest contract awarded in franchise history, the deal also included a full "no-trade" clause.

In Cleveland's home opener, Ramírez doubled in the ninth inning of a 4–1 defeat to the San Francisco Giants for his 1,000th career hit.  He won AL Player of the Month honors for April, having hit .342 (27-for-79) and .722 slugging percentage, 12 runs scored, seven doubles, a triple, seven home runs, 28 RBI, and nine bases on balls over 21 games.  During that month, he also reached the career milestone of 1,000 games played.   On May 28 versus Detroit, Ramírez homered, tripled and drove in five runs, amounting to an MLB-leading 48 RBI through the Guardians' first 42 games, tied for third-most in club history.  Of all in franchise history, only Manny Ramirez (56 in 1999), Al Rosen (49 in 1954) and Earl Averill (also 48) had equaled or surpassed José Ramírez.  He was named AL Player of the Week for the May 24–30, having recorded three home runs, three stolen bases, 11 RBI, seven total extra base hits, .348/.423/.957, three walks and one strikeout.

In 2022 he led the major leagues with 44 doubles and 20 intentional walks, batting .280/.355/.514 with 29 home runs and 126 RBIs across 685 plate appearances.

Awards and honors
 2× Bob Feller Man of the Year (2016, 2021)
 4× Major League Baseball (MLB) All-Star (2017,  2018, 2021, 2022)
 3× Silver Slugger at third base (2017, 2018, 2020)
 New youth baseball field on the west side of Cleveland opening in Spring 2023 will be named 'José Ramírez Field'.

Milestones
 30–30 club (2018)

Statistical league leader

 2× Doubles (2017, 2022)
 2× Extra base hits (2017, 2020)
 Intentional bases on balls (2022)
 2× Power–speed number (2018, 2020)

 Runs scored (2020)
 Runs created (2020)
 Sacrifice hits (2014)
 Wins Above Replacement—FanGraphs (2020)

Personal life
Ramírez has a brother, José Báez Ramírez, who also signed with the Cleveland organization.

Owing to his baseball instincts and dedication, former teammate Francisco Lindor has commented that if he were the owner of a team and given the option to sign any player in the sport, it would be Ramírez.

See also

 Cleveland Guardians award winners and league leaders
 List of Major League Baseball annual doubles leaders
 List of Major League Baseball annual runs scored leaders
 List of Major League Baseball doubles records
 List of Major League Baseball players from the Dominican Republic

References

External links

1992 births
Living people
People from Baní
American League All-Stars
Major League Baseball players from the Dominican Republic
Cleveland Indians players
Cleveland Guardians players
Arizona League Indians players
Mahoning Valley Scrappers players
Lake County Captains players
Toros del Este players
Akron Aeros players
Columbus Clippers players
Major League Baseball infielders
Silver Slugger Award winners